Jacques Martin (22 June 1933 – 14 September 2007) was a French television host and producer.

Life and career 
Martin was born in Lyon. In the late 1960s, he formed a comical duet of hosts on radio Europe 1 with French actor Jean Yanne.

In the early 1970s, he was the sidekick of Danièle Gilbert, the host of Midi Première. Martin created and hosted such popular satirical TV shows such as Le Petit Rapporteur ("The Little Snitch, 1975–1976, TF1) and La Lorgnette ("The Opera Glasses", 1976–1977, Antenne 2). He also tried a film career, writing and directing one film (Na !, 1973) and playing in others such as La Passante du Sans-Souci, without great success.

An operetta fan, he enjoyed presenting TV shows mixing popular and classical music, such as Musique and music, which he prepared with the help of French composer , invariably singing a few operetta arias himself during the show.

He was also good at creating new concepts for television shows, the most famous being Le Petit Rapporteur and L'École des Fans. He was particularly apt at interacting with small children on television, which was the reason of the success of L'École des Fans. On a side note, L'École des Fans was the first television appearance of French singer Vanessa Paradis, in 1980; she was 7 years old.

He was a regular of the radio show Les Grosses Têtes.  He was also an admirer of Sacha Guitry, whom he liked to quote and whose mannerisms he tried to emulate.

Until 1998, he hosted the entire afternoon of France 2 on Sundays, with a show called Dimanche Martin.

Illness/death 
Martin died, aged 74, from cancer, on 14 September 2007 in the Hôtel du Palais, Biarritz, where he had settled. He is buried in Guillotière Cemetery in Lyon.

Family and children 
He was married and divorced twice; his second wife, Cécilia Ciganer-Albéniz, was the second wife of French president Nicolas Sarkozy and France's first lady.

He had eight children from four different women all of whom survived him:
with his first wife Anne Lefèvre, he had two children: David Martin, cook and television host and Élise Martin.
with actress Danièle Évenou, he had two sons: Frédéric Martin, a radio host, and Jean-Baptiste Martin, actor.
with his second wife Cécilia Ciganer-Albéniz, he had two daughters: Judith Martin and Jeanne-Marie Martin.
with his last wife, Céline Boisson, he had two children: Juliette Martin and Clovis Martin.

References

External links 

1933 births
2007 deaths
Military personnel from Lyon
Chevaliers of the Légion d'honneur
Officiers of the Ordre des Arts et des Lettres
French radio presenters
French television presenters
Deaths from cancer in France
French impressionists (entertainers)